Thin Mind is the fifth studio album by Canadian indie rock band Wolf Parade. It was released on January 24, 2020 through Sub Pop.

Background 
Thin Mind is Wolf Parade's fifth studio album and their first to be released since the departure of longtime guitarist and bassist Dante DeCaro. Keyboardist Spencer Krug said that the album title refers to "... the way that being around too much tech has made our focus thin." On the album, Wolf Parade address the difficulty of managing the constant barrage of content from news and social media.

Reception
Thin Mind received generally positive reviews from music critics, the album received an average score of 70 on Metacritic based on 13 reviews.

In the AllMusic review, critic Mark Deming stated that "Thin Mind is Wolf Parade in their classic form, but with a force and a sense of purpose that makes them sound fresh and vital. Losing DeCaro seems to have goaded Krug, Boeckner, and Thompson into showing their fans they still have the goods".

Track listing

Personnel 
 Spencer Krug – vocals, keyboards
 Dan Boeckner – vocals, guitar
 Arlen Thompson - drums
 John Goodmanson - producer, engineering, mixing

References

2020 albums
Wolf Parade albums